DAG Ventures is an American venture capital firm based in Palo Alto, California. DAG Ventures works with startups in providing early stage and growth stage funding. Since its founding in 2004, by Tom Goodrich and John Cadeddu, the firm has backed nearly 180 ventures, including Ambarella Inc., Armo Biosciences, Eventbrite, Fireeye, Glassdoor, Grubhub, Nextdoor, Wealthfront, Wix.com, Yelp, and Zettle.

Funds
DAG Ventures was created out of Duff Ackerman & Goodrich, a private investment firm formed in 1991.

In June 2011, DAG Ventures announced their fifth fund.

In 2019, founding members of DAG Ventures launched a new venture fund, the Corner Ventures DAG Fund.

Investments

DAG Ventures has invested in almost 250 startups, since its inception in 2004. Notable ones are including,

References

External links

Venture capital firms of the United States
Financial services companies established in 2004
Companies based in Palo Alto, California
2004 establishments in California